Flupamesone (brand name Flutenal), also known as triamcinolone acetonide metembonate, is a synthetic glucocorticoid corticosteroid which is marketed in Spain. It is a dimer of a C21 ester of triamcinolone acetonide.

References

Acetonides
Corticosteroid cyclic ketals
Corticosteroid esters
Dimers (chemistry)
Diols
Fluoroarenes
Glucocorticoids
Naphthalenes
Polyketones
Pregnanes